Longo Caminho (Portuguese for A Long Way) is the tenth studio album by Brazilian rock band Os Paralamas do Sucesso. It was released in 2002, one year after vocalist Herbert Vianna's accident with the ultralight plane that made him paraplegic. Most of the tracks were written before the accident.

Main hits of the album included "O Calibre", an aggressive song that is a critic to the urban violence, and the ballads "Cuide Bem do Seu Amor" and "Seguindo Estrelas". "O Calibre" would be featured on the soundtrack of the film Elite Squad: The Enemy Within eight years later its release.

"Soldado da Paz" was recorded by Cidade Negra in their MTV Unplugged album, while the title track was recorded by Zélia Duncan. Argentine musician Fito Páez, a recurring collaborator for the Paralamas, provided the organ for the song "Flores e Espinhos".

The track "Flores no Deserto" was written in honor of Marcelo Yuka, former drummer of the Brazilian rap rock band O Rappa. The track "Hinchley Pond" shares its name with a farm owned by the parents of Vianna's deceased wife, Lucy Needham Vianna.

"Amor em Vão" was recorded by Paulo Ricardo, bassist of the famous Brazilian band RPM. "Flores e Espinhos" was covered by Fat Family under the name "Sou Só Um".

The track "Running on the Spot" is a cover of the Jam.

The album has sold more than 350,000 copies.

Track listing

DVD
The DVD documentary directed by Andrucha Waddington and was released in 2002. A mixture of recordings with presentations.  It includes featured with its music of Paralamas's early career Pingüins (original title Pingüins Já Não os Vejo Pois Não Está na Estação), recorded a show for the parents, friends and employees of EMI in September 2002

Track listing
O Calibre
Seguindo Estrelas (Follow the Stars)
Longo Caminho (Long Way)
Alagados
Soldado da Paz
Cuide Bem do Seu Amor
Amor em Vão (Tudo Passará)
Flores no Deserto (Flowers in the Desert)
Running on the Spot
Flores e Espinhos (Flowers and Thorns)
La Estación (The Station)
Hinchley Pond
Flores no Deserto (Flowers in the Desert)
Pingüins (Penguins)
O Calibre

References

2002 albums
Os Paralamas do Sucesso albums
EMI Records albums
Latin Grammy Award for Best Portuguese Language Rock or Alternative Album